Steve Schneider FBCS, CITP is an English computer scientist and Professor of Security. He is Director of the Surrey Centre for Cyber Security and Associate Dean (Research and Enterprise) at the University of Surrey.

Biography
Steve Schneider studied at Oxford University, joining the Oxford University Computing Laboratory (now the Oxford University Department of Computer Science) to study for a Doctorate on CSP, which was awarded in 1989, supervised by Mike Reed. He joined Royal Holloway, University of London as a lecturer in 1994, becoming a senior lecturer in 1999 and a professor in 2002.  He moved to the University of Surrey in 2004, and was head of the Department of Computer Science from 2004 until 2010.

Schneider is an expert in formal methods, including Communicating Sequential Processes (CSP) and the B-Method, and computer security.

Selected books

References

External links
 Steve Schneider's University of Surrey home page

Year of birth missing (living people)
Living people
Alumni of the University of Oxford
Members of the Department of Computer Science, University of Oxford
Academics of Royal Holloway, University of London
Academics of the University of Surrey
English computer scientists
Formal methods people
Computer science writers
British textbook writers
Fellows of the British Computer Society
Computer security academics